CD−34°8618, also known as KELT-13 or WASP-167, is a yellowish-white hued star located in the southern constellation of Centaurus. It has an apparent magnitude of 10.52, making it readily visible in medium sized telescopes, but not to the naked eye. Based on parallax measurements from the Gaia spacecraft, the object is estimated to be approximately 1,350 light years away from the Solar System.

Description
WASP-167 has a stellar classification of F1 V, indicating that it is an ordinary F-type main-sequence star that is generating energy via hydrogen fusion at its core. At present it has 1.59 times the mass of the Sun and 1.94 times the radius of the Sun. WASP-167 has an iron abundance 26% above solar levels, making it metal enriched — common among planetary hosts. The object has completed 63% of its main sequence lifetime at an age of 1 billion years.

Planetary system
A Hot Jupiter was discovered in a tight, 2 day retrograde orbit the star by the SuperWASP  and the KELT. WASP-167 was observed to have non-radial pulsations, which might be caused by the planet's close orbit.

References

F-type main-sequence stars
Planetary systems with one confirmed planet
Centaurus (constellation)
CD-34 08618